Ziziphus incurva is a medium-sized tree from the family Rhamnaceae which gives edible fruit. It is found from 900 meters to 1600 meters altitude in eastern Nepal including Kathmandu valley.

References

incurva
Endemic flora of Nepal